"Where I Wanna Be" is a song by American R&B singer Donell Jones. It was written and produced by Jones and Kyle West for his same-titled second album (1999). Released as the album's fourth and final single, the song charted at number Twenty nine on the US Billboard Hot 100 chart and number two on the Hot R&B/Hip-Hop Songs, marking his second top five hit on the latters chart. A sequel to the song titled "Where You Are (Is Where I Wanna Be) (Part 2)" appeared on Jones' next album Life Goes On in 2002. Also in 2017, singer Mariah Carey sampled the song for her single "I Don't", which featured rapper YG in the fifteen studio album.

Track listings

CD single
 "Where I Wanna Be" (Album Version)
 "Where I Wanna Be" (Instrumental)
 "Where I Wanna Be" (Call Out Hook)

12" single
 "Where I Wanna Be" (Album Version)
 "This Luv" (Album Version)
 "Where I Wanna Be" (Instrumental)
 "Where I Wanna Be" (Acapella)

Charts

Weekly charts

Year-end charts

References

2000 singles
Donell Jones songs
Music videos directed by Director X
1999 songs
Arista Records singles
LaFace Records singles
Songs written by Kyle West
Songs written by Donell Jones
Contemporary R&B ballads
2000s ballads